John Curran is a Republican member of the Illinois Senate. He took office in July 2017 after accepting an appointment to replace Senate Minority Leader Christine Radogno who resigned July 1, 2017. He represents the 41st district which includes all or parts of Lemont, Indian Head Park, LaGrange Western Springs, Homer Glen, Burr Ridge, Darien, Downers Grove, Lisle, Willowbrook, Woodridge, Naperville, and Bolingbrook.

Curran has served as the Minority leader in the Illinois Senate since January 11, 2023.

Electoral career
Curran began his political career as a Woodridge Village Trustee and member of the DuPage County Board, where he served as vice chair. Curran received his bachelor's degree from the University of Illinois at Urbana Champaign and his law degree from Northern Illinois University College of Law. Following 19 years working as an Assistant State's Attorney in the Cook County State's Attorney's Office, Curran now works as an attorney at a private law firm in Oak Brook.

Illinois Senate
On November 15, 2022, after Republicans underperformed in the 2022 Illinois Senate election, Curran was unanimously elected by his caucus to succeed Dan McConchie as the new Illinois Senate Minority Leader.

Committees
Curran serves on the following committees: Assignments (Minority Spokesperson); Ethics (Minority Spokesperson); Health; Healthcare Access and Availability; Higher Education; Licensed Activities; Insurance; Subcommittee on Medicaid; Appropriations; App- Agriculture, Envir. & Energy; App-Health (Sub-Minority Spokesperson); App-Human Services (Sub-Minority Spokesperson); Redistricting- Chi. West and W Cook; Redistricting- Kankakee & Will; Redistricting- South Cook County (Sub-Minority Spokesperson); Redistricting- DuPage County (Sub-Minority).

Personal life
In addition to his legal work and public service, Curran sits on the Board of Directors for the Downers Grove Economic Development Corporation, which has a mission of helping retain, expand and attract new businesses to the Village of Downers Grove.

Curran, his wife, Sue, their four daughters and a niece live in Downers Grove.

References

External links
 Official profile at the Illinois General Assembly

21st-century American politicians
Illinois city council members
Illinois lawyers
Living people
Northern Illinois University alumni
People from Woodridge, Illinois
Republican Party Illinois state senators
University of Illinois Urbana-Champaign alumni
Year of birth missing (living people)